Praseetha Menon (born 1976) is an Indian actress and comedian who appears in Malayalam films, television and stage. She made her acting debut through Moonnam Mura in 1988 as a child artist.

She started her career as a mimicry artist at a young age and later became an actress. Praseetha has appeared in more than 35 malayalam films in several character and comedy roles. She came into limelight after started playing the role of Ammayi in Badai Bungalow, a sketch comedy and celebrity talk show.

Filmography

TV Serials/Shows
 Mohapakshikal
 Priyam
 Sthree
 Manchiyam
 Padmasree Padmavathi
 Badai Bungalow
 Cinemala
 Comedy Show
 Super Challenge
 Star Trek
 Playback
 Comedy Super Show
 Cinima Chirima
 Vanitha
 Annies Kitchen

Play
The Island of Blood

References

Indian film actresses
Indian television actresses
Indian stage actresses
Living people
Actresses in Malayalam cinema
20th-century Indian actresses
21st-century Indian actresses
1976 births
Actresses in Malayalam television